Michael (Mike) Eigen (born January 11, 1936 in Passaic, New Jersey) is a psychologist and psychoanalyst. He is the author of 26 books. Eigen is known for his work with patients "who had been given up on by others", including people who experience psychosis.

Biography
Eigen was born in Passaic, New Jersey to a Jewish family, the son of Jeanette (née Brody), a teacher, and Sol, a lawyer.
Eigen received his B.A. (with honors) in 1957 from the University of Pennsylvania and his PhD in 1974 from The New School. 
He married Betty Gitelman on December 27, 1980. Betty is also a therapist. Eigen stated that he admires her and says that she “can help and treat people no one else can help.”  They have two sons, David and Jacob.

Therapeutic Approach
Eigen relates to his patients with humility and curiosity. He learns from his patients. In talking about his approach to therapy, he stated that "I am hoping, praying that something real, useful, something that touches another soul happens, something that helps others feel how much there is to feel, how precious psychic reality is, how precious and complex and amazing we are."

Mysticism
Eigen integrates mysticism into his work with psychoanalysis. He draws on the work of a number of analysts and spiritual traditions in this work. He explained that he is "not a scholar, systematic reader, or follower of any school." Eigen is particularly engaged with the work of Wilfred Bion. Eigen described how "Bion uses many images and expressions from religious and mystical life to portray psychoanalytic processes."

Writings

Selected articles
 "On Breathing and Identity". Journal of Humanistic Psychology, (1977) 17(3), 35-39. 10.1177/002216787701700304
 "The Area of Faith in Winnicott, Lacan, and Bion". International Journal of the Psychoanalytic Association, (1981) 64: 413-33
 "Dream Images". Journal of Religion and Health, (2004) 43(2), 115–122. 
 "Beginnings and Endings in Therapy". ISPS-US Newsletter, (2007) 8(2): 8. https://www.isps-us.org/newsletters/NewsletterFall-Dec-2007.pdf
 "Incommunicado core and boundless supporting unknown". European Journal of Psychotherapy & Counselling, (2007) 9: 415-22
 "Life kills, aliveness kills". New Therapist, (2012) 76 The Bad Edition.
 "O, Orgasm and Beyond". Psychoanalytic Dialogues, (2015) 25(5), 646–654. 
 "Affect Images and States". The Journal of Humanistic Psychology, (2019) 59(5), 714–719.

Books

 The Psychotic Core (1986)
 Psychic Deadness (1996)
 The Psychoanalytic Mystic (1998)
 Toxic Nourishment (1999)
 Ecstasy (2001)
 Damaged Bonds (2001)
 Rage (2002)
 The Sensitive Self (2004)
 The Electrified Tightrope (2004)
 Emotional Storm (2005)
 Feeling Matters (2006)
 Conversations with Michael Eigen (with Aner Grovin) (2007)
 Flames from the Unconscious (2009)
 Eigen in Seoul: Volume 1: Madness and Murder (2010)
 Eigen in Seoul: Volume 2: Faith and Transformation (2011)
 Contact with the Depths (2011)
 Kabbalah and Psychoanalysis (2012)
 Reshaping the Self: Reflections on Renewal Through Therapy (2013)
 A Felt Sense: More Explorations of Psychoanalysis and Kabbalah (2014)
 The Birth of Experience (2014)
 Faith (2014)
 Image, Sense, Infinities, and Everyday Life (2015)
 Under the Totem: In Search of a Path (2016)
 The Challenge of Being Human (2018)
 Dialogues with Michael Eigen: Psyche Singing, ed.: Loray Daws (2019)
 Eigen in Seoul Volume Three: Pain and Beauty, Terror and Wonder (2021)

See also

References

Further reading
Anthony Molino (1996): Elaborate Selves: Reflections and Reveries of Christopher Bollas, Michael Eigen, Polly Young-Eisendrath, Samuel and Evelyn Laeuchli, and Marie Coleman Nelson
Stephen A. Mitchell/Lewis Aron eds. (2013): Relational Psychoanalysis Vol I 
Stephen Bloch and Loray Daws (2015): Living Moments: On the Work of Michael Eigen
Fuchsman, Ken/Cohen, Keri S. eds. (2021): Healing, Rebirth and the Work of Michael Eigen: Collected Essays on a Pioneer in Psychoanalysis
Loray Daws (2022): Michael Eigen: A Contemporary Introduction
Robin Bagai (2022): Commentaries on the Work of Michael Eigen: Oblivion and Wisdom, Madness and Music

External links 
 Therapist from the Depths

American psychoanalysts
Jewish psychoanalysts
Jewish American writers
Mysticism
1936 births
Living people
21st-century American Jews